Ayanda Ndulani (born April 4, 1997) is a South African professional boxer who has held the IBO minimumweight title since 2021.

Professional boxing career

Early career
Ndulani made his professional debut against Vuyani Swartbooi on June 27, 2015. He won the fight by a fourth-round technical knockout. He amassed a 10–2–1 record during the next four years, before making his first world title challenge.

IBO minimumweight champion

Ndulani vs. Joyi
Ndulani was scheduled to challenge the reigning IBO minimumweight champion Nkosinathi Joyi on May 21, 2021, at the International Convention Centre in East London, Eastern Cape. Both fighters came into the bout after a two year absence from the sport, with Ndulani's last fight taking place on September 28, 2019, while Joyi's last fight took place on December 16, 2019. The incumbent champion was regarded as the favorite to retain the title, while Ndulani came in as a moderate underdog and was dubbed a dark horse. Joyi weighed in at 48.10kg at the official weigh-ins, which was almost 500g above the 47.63kg limit. Accordingly, he was stripped of the title, leaving Ndulani as the only one eligible to capture the now vacant belt. Ndulani won the fight by a fourth-round knockout. The visibly drained Joyi was knocked down twice in the second round, although he was able to beat the eight count both times. The former champion was once again floored at the 1:31 minute mark of the fourth round, after which the referee decided to stop the fight.

The Baleni trilogy
Ndulani was booked to make his maiden IBO minimumweight title defense against the former WBO Global and African minimumweight champion Siphamandla Baleni. The bout took place on November 26, 2021, at the International Convention Centre in East London, South Africa. Ndulani won the rematch by split decision, with two judges awarding him a 117–111 and 116–112 scorecards respectively, while the third judge scored it 118–114 for Baleni. Baleni later contested the result of the decision with the IBO, who ruled against him on May 18, 2022, confirming Ndulani as their minimumweight champion.

Despite the IBO ruling, Ndulani chose to give Siphamandla Baleni a second chance at the title. The rematch was one of five titles bouts which were scheduled as part of the annual boxing celebration of former president Nelson Mandela, and was expected to take place on August 3, 2022, at the same venue in which their first bout transpired. On July 27, Xaba Promotions announced that the bout was postponed due to budgetary constraints, and would be rescheduled for September 4. Ndulani won the fight by split decision, the same as in their previous encounter.

Ndulani vs. Soto
On November 9, 2022, during the annual WBC convention, the sanctioning body formally ordered a mini-flyweight title eliminator between Ndulani and Luis Castillo Soto. The fight was expected to take place on February 25, 2023, at the ICC Durban in Durban, South Africa on the undercard of the Michael Mendoza and Landi Ngxeke super flyweight bout, but was postponed as Ngxeke came down with bronchitis. The bout was re-scheduled to take place on March 31, 2023.

Professional boxing record

See also
 List of IBO world champions

References

1997 births
Living people
South African male boxers
Mini-flyweight boxers
World mini-flyweight boxing champions
International Boxing Organization champions
Sportspeople from East London, Eastern Cape

External links